Kabzeel (Trans: Qabtsĕ'el, "God gathers") is a Hebrew Bible place name. It was the most remote city of Judah; located in southern Judah on the border of Edom (Idumaea). The location is tentatively identified with Khirbet Hora (Horvat Hur), about 10 km (6 mi) ENE of Beer-sheba. Kabzeel was the birthplace of Benaiah, one of David's chief warriors. Following the Exile, it was resettled under the name Jekabzeel.

See also
 List of biblical places starting with K
 Benaiah

Footnotes

References

External links
  Tel Be'er Shev'a - Nearby ancient sites

Hebrew Bible cities